I'm Still Here is the fifth and final studio album by American country music artist Mindy McCready. It was released on March 23, 2010, via Linus Entertainment. The album includes the single "I'm Still Here," as well as re-recordings of her 1996 singles "Guys Do It All the Time" and "Ten Thousand Angels." Mindy performed on Fox & Friends to promote the album in April 2010. This is McCready's final release before her death in 2013.

Track listing

Personnel

 Matt Billingslea – drums
 Stevie Blacke – synthesizer strings
 Richard "Spady" Brannan – bass guitar
 Mike Brignardello – bass guitar
 Trey Bruce – electric guitar, percussion
 Pat Buchanan – electric guitar
 Larry Byrom – acoustic guitar
 Smith Curry – pedal steel guitar, dobro
 Paul Franklin – pedal steel guitar
 Jason "Slim" Gambill – electric guitar
 Tony Harrell – keyboards, piano
 Christopher Jak – acoustic guitar, electric guitar, background vocals
 Jeremy Lawton – keyboards, piano
 Robin Lee – background vocals
 Paul Leim – drums
 Mindy McCready – lead vocals
 Jerry McPherson – electric guitar
 Brent Mason – electric guitar
 Stewart Meyers – bass guitar
 Greg Morrow – drums
 Wendy Moten – background vocals
 Jimmy Nichols – keyboards, piano, background vocals
 John Osborne – electric guitar
 Michael Spriggs – acoustic guitar
 Stephanie Lane Stephenson – background vocals
 Crystal Taliaferro – background vocals
 Rachel Thibodeau – background vocals
 Patrick Warren – keyboards, piano
 Charlie Worsham – mandolin
 Jonathan Yudkin – cello, viola, violin

Critical reception

Stephen Thomas Erlewine of Allmusic gave the album three out of five stars, stating "the songs are generally a mixed bag, veering from sweetly melancholy to syrupy, but McCready has never been more sensitive as a vocalist, pulling the album through the rough patches and convincingly selling the notion that she’s a sober survivor." Jessica Phillips of Country Weekly magazine rated it two-and-a-half stars out of five, saying that it "peaks" with the title track. She said that McCready's vocals were "confident" but added that the album was a "hodgepodge of songs."

References

2010 albums
Mindy McCready albums